Till Death Do Us Part is the seventh studio album by American hip hop group Cypress Hill, released on March 23, 2004 by Columbia Records. This album showed the group introducing reggae elements, especially in the lead single "What's Your Number?", which samples the bass line from The Clash song "The Guns of Brixton." Another song titled "Ganja Bus" features vocals from Damian Marley (son of Bob Marley).

Two different CD covers (artwork) exist: The European and Japanese releases feature the standard sepia version of a picture of a statue of a crucifixion scene. The North American CD version includes a free sticker which is a black and white cover with the "old" logo on it. It has a square of thorns and roses around it. This is removable and inserted over the regular cover.

Reception

Rolling Stone  "[T]he combination of mournful maturity and club-ready fun they come up with on Till Death Do Us Part suits them just fine."
Q magazine  "[A] funk-driven return to familiar ground, laced with dark imagery, beefy hooks and sharp vocal trading."

Track listing

"Tracks 17 and 18 are Japanese Exclusive Tracks."

Album singles

Personnel

B-Real - vocals
Sen Dog -  vocals
DJ Muggs - producer, executive producer, mixing
Eric Bobo - percussion
The Alchemist - producer, engineer
Tony Kelly - producer
Tim Armstrong - guitar, vocals, guest appearance
Tego Calderón - guest appearance
Damian "Junior Gong" Marley - guest appearance
Prodigy - guest appearance
Fredwreck - guitar, keyboards, moog synthesizer, producer, mixing
Mike Sims - bass, guitar, keyboards, prayers

Rob Hill (producer) - bass, programming, mixing
Rogelio Lozano - guitar, programming
Reggie Stewart - bass, guitar
Tracy Nelson - vocals
Chace Infinite - vocals
Dan Boer - keyboards
Tim "Johnny Vegas" Burton - saxophone
Ray Ramundo - conga
Scott Abels - drums
Al Pahanish Jr.- drums
Brian "Big Bass" Gardener - mastering
Robb Episano - photo assistance

Charts
Album - Billboard (United States)

Certifications

References

External links

Cypress Hill albums
2004 albums
Columbia Records albums
Albums produced by the Alchemist (musician)
Albums produced by DJ Muggs
Albums produced by Fredwreck
Ruffhouse Records albums